Daniel York is a Scottish rugby union player who is a Stage 3 Scottish Rugby Academy player assigned to Glasgow Warriors. His usual position is at the Prop position.

Rugby Union career

Amateur career

York started his rugby union career playing for his school St Aloysius' College, Glasgow.

He then moved to play for West of Scotland.

York was named in the 2016-17 Scottish Rugby Academy.

He signed for Glasgow Hawks for 2017.

Professional career

York has played for Glasgow District at Under 16.

West of Scotland District U18 side against the East of Scotland U18.

York trained with the Glasgow Warriors in the 2017-18 pre-season. Coach Kenny Murray praised him saying "he had applied himself really well".

York graduated to be a Stage 3 player in the BT Sport Scottish Rugby Academy and named in the second intake of the 2017-18 season to the Glasgow regional academy and assigned to Glasgow Warriors.

International career

York has played for the Scotland U18s.

References 

Living people
Scottish rugby union players
Rugby union props
Glasgow Warriors players
Glasgow Hawks players
West of Scotland FC players
Year of birth missing (living people)